National Tertiary Route 617, or just Route 617 (or ) is a National Road Route of Costa Rica, located in the Puntarenas province.

Description
In Puntarenas province the route covers Coto Brus canton (Sabalito, Aguabuena districts).

References

Highways in Costa Rica